Gilbert Hanse (born August 12, 1963) is an American golf course architect. Hanse, along with his business partner Jim Wagner, was selected to design the Rio 2016 Olympic Golf Course, the first Olympic venue to host golf since 1904.

Education
Attended secondary school at Hunter Tannersville High school in Tannersville, New York and earned his undergraduate degree from the University of Denver.  Hanse earned a master's in landscape architecture from Cornell University in 1989. Hanse was the recipient of the William Frederick Dreer Award, which allowed him to spend a year in Great Britain studying the history of golf architecture.

Golf Course Design
In 1993 Hanse founded Hanse Golf Course Design. His longtime design partner Jim Wagner joined the firm in 1995. Friend and golf historian Geoff Shackelford has also assisted in the design of several projects.  Other members of the design team include Kevin Murphy, Ben Hillard, Bill Kittleman, Tom Naccarato, Amy Alcott.  Hanse Golf Design's in house golf construction team is named Caveman Construction.  Hanse has mentored younger golf architects in various projects as shapers, notably Kyle Franz at The 2016 Rio Olympic Golf Course, Blake Conant at Oakland Hills Country Club (South), Kye Goalby at Pinehurst Number 4, Angela Moser at Los Angeles Country Club(South).

Golf Courses (Original Design)

Applebrook Golf Club, 2001

Ban Rakat Club - Ballyshear, Thailand, 2021  

Boston Golf Club, Hingham, Massachusetts, 2005

CapRock Ranch, Valentine, Nebraska, 2021

Craighead at Crail Golfing Society, Scotland, 1998

Castle Stuart, Scotland, 2009

Circle T Ranch, Westlake, Texas, 2021

DAMAC Hills, Dubai, United Arab Emirates, 2016 

Fields Ranch East at PGA Frisco, Texas, 2023  

French Creek Golf Club, Pennsylvania, 2004

Golf Club of DBI, Tennessee, 2023

High Grove, Florida, 2024

Inniscrone Golf Club, Pennsylvania, 1998

Jonathan’s Landing Golf Club, Jupiter, Florida, 2021

Ladera, Thermal, California, 2022

Kinsale, Florida, 2024

Les Bordes(New), France 2021 

Mossy Oak Golf Club, West Point, Mississippi, 2016

Ohoopee Match Club, Georgia, 2018

Olympic Golf Course, Brazil, Rio de Janeiro, 2016

Pinehurst (The Cradle), North Carolina, 2017

Prairie Club(Horse), Valentine, Nebraska, 2010

Querencia Golf Club, Mexico, TBA

Rustic Canyon, California, 2002

Stonewall(Old Course), Pennsylvania, 1992

Streamsong Black, Florida, 2017

The Vineyard Club, Massachusetts, 2015

Three Lakes (North), Florida, 2024

West Palm Beach Muni Golf Park, Florida, 2023

Golf Courses (Restoration)

Aronimink Golf Club, Pennsylvania, 2018

Baltusrol (Lower), New Jersey, 2020

Baltusrol (Upper), New Jersey, 2023

Country Club of Rochester, New York, 2001

Cobbs Creek, Pennsylvania, 2025

Denison University Golf Course, Ohio, 2023

Denver Country Club, Colorado, 2009

Essex County, New Jersey, 2004

Fenway Golf Club, New York, 1997

Fishers Island Club, New York, 1995

Gulph Mills, Pennsylvania, 2000

Honors Course, Tennessee, 2022

Kittansett Club, Massachusetts, 1995

Lake Merced Golf Club, California, 2022

Lakewood Country Club, Colorado, 1993

Los Angeles Country Club (North), California, 2007

Marion, Massachusetts, 2024

Merion (East), Pennsylvania, 2014

Merion (West), Pennsylvania, 2025

Myopia Hunt, Massachusetts, 2011

Oakland Hills Country Club, Bloomfield Township, Michigan, South Course, 2020

Oakmont Country Club, Pennsylvania, 2023

Olympic Club (Lake), San Francisco, California, 2025

Quaker Ridge, New York, 2002

Palmetto Golf Club, South Carolina, 2007

Plainfield Country Club, New Jersey, 1999

Ridgewood Country Club, New Jersey, 1999

Rockaway Hunting Club, 2009

Rolling Green, Pennsylvania, 2021

Sakonnet Golf Club, Rhode Island, 1999

Savannah Golf Club, Georgia, 2018

Sleepy Hollow Country Club, New York, 2006

Southern Hills Country Club, Oklahoma, 2015

St. George's Golf and Country Club, New York, 1999

Taconic Country Club, Massachusetts, 2008

The Creek, New York, 1997

The Country Club, Ohio, 2023

The Country Club, Massachusetts, 2009

Tokyo Golf Club, Japan, 2008

Waverley Country Club, Oregon, 2009

Westhampton Country Club, New York, 2009

Wianno Club, Massachusetts, 2012

Winged Foot(East), New York, 2014

Winged Foot(West), New York, 2017

Worcester Country Club, Massachusetts, 2018

Yale Golf Course, Connecticut, 2024

Golf Courses (Renovation)
Burning Tree, Bethesda, Maryland, 2019

Colonial Country Club, Fort Worth, Texas, 2024

Gavea, Rio de Janeiro, Brazil, 2018

La Costa (Champions), 2024

Los Angeles Country Club (South), California, 2016

Narin & Portnoo Links, Donegal, Ireland, 2020

Pinehurst(Number 4), Pinehurst, North Carolina, 2016

Royal Sydney, Australia, 2023

Soule Park, Ojai, California, 2005

TPC Boston, Massachusetts, 2007

Sewanee: The University of the South Golf Course, 2013

Golf Courses (Closed/No Longer Exist - NLE)
The Capstone Club, Brookwood, Alabama, Opened in 2002 – Closed in 2014

Tallgrass, Shoreham, New York, Opened in 2000 – Closed in 2017

References

American architects
Golf course architects
Cornell University alumni
1963 births
Living people
People from Greene County, New York